Spodoptera dolichos, the dolichos armyworm moth or sweetpotato armyworm moth, is a moth of the family Noctuidae. The species was first described by Johan Christian Fabricius in 1794. It is found from the southern United States (including Alabama, Florida, Georgia, Louisiana, Mississippi, South Carolina, and Texas), south through Costa Rica to South America, as far south as Argentina. In the United States, it may occur as far north as Kentucky and Maryland.

The larvae are polyphagous and feed on a wide range of wild and cultivated plants

References

dolichos
Moths of North America
Moths of the Caribbean
Moths of Central America
Moths of South America
Moths of Cuba
Lepidoptera of Jamaica
Moths described in 1794